Jhon Adolfo Obregón Quiñones (born 8 February 1990) is a Colombian footballer who plays as a striker for Ayacucho FC.

External links
Football Database profile

1990 births
Living people
Footballers from Cali
Colombian footballers
Association football forwards
Bolivian Primera División players
La Paz F.C. players
Nacional Potosí players
C.D. Veracruz footballers
Jhon Obregon
Jhon Obregon
Guarani FC players
Cypriot First Division players
Ethnikos Achna FC players
FK Vardar players
Colombian expatriate footballers
Colombian expatriate sportspeople in Bolivia
Expatriate footballers in Bolivia
Colombian expatriate sportspeople in Mexico
Expatriate footballers in Mexico
Expatriate footballers in Thailand
Colombian expatriate sportspeople in Brazil
Expatriate footballers in Brazil
Expatriate footballers in Cyprus
Expatriate footballers in North Macedonia
Expatriate footballers in Malta
Colombian expatriate sportspeople in Malta
Colombian expatriate sportspeople in Cyprus
Colombian expatriate sportspeople in Thailand